Missouri State Militia may refer to any of several military organizations of the American Civil War:
Missouri State Militia (pre-Missouri State Guard)
Missouri State Guard
Missouri State Militia (Union)
Enrolled Missouri Militia
Provisional Enrolled Missouri Militia

or rarely
Missouri Home Guard (Union)
Missouri Minutemen